Mujib Cabinet is the name of any of four cabinets of the Republic of Bangladesh:
Cabinet Mujib I also known as Provisional Government of Bangladesh or Mujibnagar Government (1971–1972)
Cabinet Mujib II (1972–1973)
Cabinet Mujib III (1973–1975)
Cabinet Mujib IV also known as BaKSHAL Government (1975)

See also 
Sheikh Mujibur Rahman